

Qualification system
A total of 80 synchronized swimmers will qualify to compete at the games. 8 teams of nine athletes (including one reserve) along with an additional four duets will qualify to compete at the games. The host nation is automatically qualified with a team of nine athletes. A NOC may enter a maximum of nine athletes, if it has qualified a team and two athletes if it has qualified only a duet.

Canada as host nation and the United States, as being the only member located in zone 3 automatically qualify a full team. The South American region and the Central American and Caribbean region will qualify three teams and five duets each. Therefore, a total of eight teams and twelve duets will qualify. All countries qualifying a team will also qualify a duet, the pair most consist of two athletes that compete in the team event.

Qualification timeline

Qualification summary

Team

Duet

References

P
Qualification for the 2015 Pan American Games
Synchronized swimming at the 2015 Pan American Games